Citrus medica var. sarcodactylis, or the fingered citron, is an unusually-shaped citron variety whose fruit is segmented into finger-like sections, resembling those seen on representations of the Buddha. It is called Buddha's hand in many languages including English, Chinese, Japanese, Korean, Vietnamese, and French.

The different cultivars and variations of this citron variety form a gradient from "open-hand" types with outward-splayed segments to "closed-hand" types, in which the fingers are kept together. There are also half-fingered fruits, in which the basal side is united and the apical side fingered. The origin of this kind of citron is commonly traced back to South or East Asia, probably northeastern India or China, where most domesticated citrus fruits originate.

Description
Citrus medica var. sarcodactylis is, like any other citron variety, a shrub or small tree with long, irregular branches covered in thorns. Its large, oblong leaves are pale green and grow about four to six inches. Its white flowers are tinted purplish from the outside and grow in fragrant clusters. The fruit's fingers contain only the white part of the fruit and sometimes a small amount of acidic pulp, but many of them are completely juiceless and some are seedless.

The plant is sensitive to frost, as well as intense heat and drought. It grows best in a temperate climate. Trees can be grown from cuttings taken from branches two to four years old. It is very commonly grafted onto sufficient rootstock.

Uses

Perfumery
Buddha's hand fruit is very fragrant and is used predominantly in China and Japan for perfuming rooms and personal items such as clothing.

Religious
The fruit may be given as a religious offering in Buddhist temples. According to tradition, Buddha prefers the "fingers" of the fruit to be in a position where they resemble a closed rather than open hand, as closed hands symbolize to Buddha the act of prayer. In China, the Buddha's hand fruit is a symbol of happiness, longevity, and good fortune. It is also a traditional temple offering and a New Year's gift.

Ornamental
The fingered citron is cultivated as an ornamental tree in gardens and containers on patios and terraces.

Food and medicine
Unlike other citrus fruits, most varieties of the Buddha's hand fruit contain no pulp or juice. Though esteemed chiefly for its "exquisite form and aroma", the Buddha's hand fruit can also be eaten (often as a zest or flavouring) in desserts, savory dishes, and alcoholic beverages (such as vodka or rice liquor) or candied as a sweet. The sliced, dried peel of immature fruits is also prescribed as a tonic in traditional medicine.

Gallery

See also
Japanese citrus

References

External links

 Pictures

Citron
Fruits originating in Asia
Garden plants of Asia
Ornamental trees